Nic fit is a colloquial expression for Nicotine withdrawal. It may also refer to:

Music
 a song by the Untouchables
 covered on the Sonic Youth album Dirty